Axel Wilfredo Werner (born 28 February 1996) is an Argentine professional footballer as a goalkeeper for La Liga club Elche.

Club career

Atlético Rafaela
Born in Rafaela, Werner was an Atlético Rafaela youth graduate. On 10 August 2015 he made his professional debut, starting in a 5–1 routing of Deportivo Merlo, for the year's Copa Argentina.

Werner made his Primera División debut on 3 October 2015, starting in a 1–1 away draw against Arsenal. In March 2016 he was chosen as a first-choice, as starter Germán Montoya was injured; the latter subsequently moved to Belgrano.

Atlético Madrid and loans
On 20 August 2016, Werner signed a five-year contract with La Liga club Atlético Madrid, being immediately loaned to Boca Juniors for one season. He returned to Atleti ahead of the 2017–18 season, being third-choice behind Jan Oblak and Miguel Ángel Moyà.

On 8 March 2018, after Moyà was released, Werner made his competitive debut for Atlético by starting in a 3–0 UEFA Europa League home defeat of FC Lokomotiv Moscow. On 29 April of the following year, he made his La Liga debut by playing the full 90 minutes in a 1–0 win at Deportivo Alavés.

On 11 July 2018, Werner joined newly promoted La Liga club SD Huesca on one-year loan. A third-choice behind Roberto Santamaría and Aleksandar Jovanović, he only featured in eight league matches overall during the campaign, as his side suffered relegation

On 21 June 2019, Werner one again went on loan, this time to Atlético San Luis in Mexico. After spending his first season as a backup to Carlos Felipe Rodríguez, he became the first-choice option in 2020–21 season, after his loan was extended for a further year.

Elche
On 1 September 2021, free agent Werner returned to Spain and its top tier, after signing a two-year contract with Elche CF. After being a third-choice behind Édgar Badía and Kiko Casilla, he was loaned to Arsenal de Sarandí back in his home country the following 31 January.

On 30 January 2022, Werner was loaned out to Argentine club Arsenal de Sarandí until the end of 2022.

International career
In 2013, Werner was called up to Argentina under-17s for the year's FIFA U-17 World Cup, as a backup to Augusto Batalla. He appeared in only one match in the tournament, a 1–4 loss against Sweden on 8 November.

On 1 July 2016, Werner was called up for the Summer Olympics in the place of Batalla, who was impeded to play by his club, River Plate.

Career statistics

Club

Honours
Boca Juniors
 Primera División: 2016–17

Atlético Madrid
 UEFA Europa League: 2017–18

References

External links

1996 births
Living people
People from Rafaela
Argentine people of German descent
Sportspeople from Santa Fe Province
Argentine footballers
Association football goalkeepers
Argentina youth international footballers
Argentine Primera División players
Footballers at the 2016 Summer Olympics
Olympic footballers of Argentina
Atlético de Rafaela footballers
Atlético Madrid footballers
Boca Juniors footballers
Málaga CF players
Atlético San Luis footballers
SD Huesca footballers
Elche CF players
Arsenal de Sarandí footballers
La Liga players
Liga MX players
Argentine expatriate footballers
Argentine expatriate sportspeople in Spain
Argentine expatriate sportspeople in Mexico
Expatriate footballers in Spain
Expatriate footballers in Mexico